Hashim Jalilul Alam Aqamaddin (1825 – 1906) was the 25th Sultan of Brunei from 30 May 1885 to 10 May 1906.

Early life 
Hashim Jalilul Alam Aqamaddin was born in 1825 and son to then Sultan Abdul Momin. Before becoming the Sultan, he was one of the four Wazirs (Vizier) in Brunei and was known as Pengiran Temenggong Sahibul Bahar Pengiran Anak Hashim.

Reign (1885-1906)
Upon his ascension to the throne on 29 May 1885, he decided to not to appoint a replacement for his previous position in office of Pengiran Temenggung which left three other Wazirs, thus improving his income and finances.

Dispute over Limbang 
He faced a challenge from the British North Borneo Company (BNBC) and the Brooke government (White Rajahs) in Sarawak who wanted more land from Brunei and it was not strong enough to stop the land grabs. In the hopes of improving the relations between the Sultan and the White Rajahs to settle the conflict in Limbang, he leased the settlement of Punang Terusan to Sarawak in 1885. Unfortunately in November of that same year, tensions would rise again in Limbang after the murders of multiple Bruneian Malays. The two alleged culprits were offered to be handed over to the Sultan but later declined as they were not the guilty parties. Due to his decision, the people of Limbang protested and refused to pay their taxes in which was taken advantage of by both the British Consul General Peter Lays and Rajah Charles Brooke. The Sultan eventually agreed to lease Limbang for 6,000 Sarawak dollars per year.

Annexation of Limbang 
The British government agreed to the White Rajahs' persuasive thesis in that same year, thus Limbang came into Sarawak's rule after arguing that the Sultan no longer has the ability to govern the colony. In November 1886, Wazirs and people of Bandar Brunei demanded that Limbang to be returned to Brunei with the slogan of "Brunei is the spirit of Limbang and Limbang is the (physical) body of Brunei". The demand was motivated by Abdul Momin's Amanah. In 1887, he wrote to the British Crown with the intention of requesting a British Resident to be put in place. That same year, Padas-Damit was also among the areas annexed. Sultan Hashim made a minor change in Brunei's coinage with the introduction of the copper one cent in 1887.

Treaty of Protection 
Not until 17 September 1888, the Sultan signed a Treaty of Protection with Sir Hugh Low of Great Britain in order to prevent further lost of Bruneian territories. The treaty handed the country's foreign affairs over to the Great Britain and would only gain more power after the installment of the British Resident in the Supplementary Agreement of 1905/1906. Tho Brunei came under British protectorate, the last territory to be annexed was the Pandaruan District in 1890, with no actions taken by the British.

In 1902, Brooke and Hewett asked him to cede Belait and Tutong to them but he refused and said, "What would happen to me, my chiefs and my descendants? I should be left like a tree, stripped of branches and twigs." They also offered $8,000 Sarawak dollars to the Sultan to lease both Tutong and Belait rivers.

Supplementary Agreement

British Resident 
Under this treaty, Brunei accepted a British Resident to advise the Sultan on both external and internal affairs except those relating to Islam and Malay customs. The Sultan felt that the British were not upholding their words in the treaty and so he sought help by writing a letter to Sultan Abdul Hamid of Ottoman Turkey. The letter to the Turkish Consul General was discovered letter and confiscated from them by Hewett, the British Resident of the West Coast of Sarawak. Malcolm Stewart Hannibal McArthur was sent to solve the problems in Brunei and began negotiations with the Sultan which finally successfully introduced Residential system to Brunei.

National flag of Brunei 
After Brunei signed the Supplementary Agreement of 1905/1906, which made the sultanate a British shade, it was deemed of interest that they should have their own national flag like other countries. Design proposals were made and eventually agreed upon that the design of the flag would be based on the yellow and the irregular colors of white and black. All of these colors have their own symbolic meanings, yellow being the symbol for the Sultan, white being the symbol for the Pengiran Bendahara, and black being the symbol for the Pengiran Pemancha.

Death
Hashim died on 10 May 1906, and was buried at the Royal Mausoleum in Bandar Brunei, alongside his father, Omar Ali Saifuddin II. He was succeeded by his eldest surviving son, Pengiran Muda Bongsu Muhammad Jamalul Alam.

Towards the end of his life, Sultan Hashim was 'unwilling to trust any of his chiefs' and depended 'almost exclusively ' upon the help of Edmund Roberts, Manager of the Brunei cutch works and as Director of Public Works in Brunei and Labuan. Till his death, he refused to sanction Limbang and pleaded to the British government to return it back to Brunei.

Personal life 
He was married twice and with the notable being Pengiran Isteri Pengiran Siti Fatimah as she gave birth to Hashim's successor Muhammad Jamalul Alam II.

Legacy 

 Istana Sultan Hashim Jalilul Alam Aqamaddin, a palace built in Kampong Ayer in the 1880s and was dismantled.
 Jalan Sultan Hashim, a road named after him in Seria.

References

19th-century Sultans of Brunei
20th-century Sultans of Brunei
1825 births
1906 deaths